Samtredia is a district of Georgia, in the region of Imereti. Its main town is Samtredia.

Population: 48,562 (2014 census).

Area: 364 km2.

Politics
Samtredia Municipal Assembly (Georgian: სამტრედიის საკრებულო) is a representative body in Samtredia Municipality, consisting of 33 members and elected every four years. The last election was held in October 2021.

Gallery

See also 
 List of municipalities in Georgia (country)

References

External links 
 Districts of Georgia, Statoids.com

Municipalities of Imereti